Alkali is a specific type of chemical base.

Alkali may refer to:

Places 
 Alkali, Nevada, United States, a ghost town
 Alkali Lake (disambiguation)
 An island in Lake Abaya, Ethiopia

People
 Ibrahim Alkali (born 1940), Nigerian air commodore and military governor of Kwara State from 1987 to 1989
 Mohammed Alkali (born 1950), Nigerian politician
 Zaynab Alkali (born 1950), Nigerian novelist, poet and short story writer

Other uses
"Alkali", the NATO reporting name of the Kaliningrad K-5 air-to-air missile

See also
 Akali (disambiguation)
 Alkali Falls, Oregon
 Alkali Ridge, Utah, a set of archaeological remains of the earliest forms of Puebloan architecture
 The Rub' al Khali, also known as the Great Sandy Desert
 Judah Alkalai (1798–1878), Sephardic Jewish rabbi
 Alkali metals
 Alçalı (disambiguation)
 Alkaline (disambiguation)